Emma-Jayne Wilson (born September 1, 1981) is a Sovereign and Eclipse Award-winning jockey in Thoroughbred horse racing. She began taking riding lessons at age nine, and after finishing high school in Brampton, she studied equine management at Kemptville College, part of the University of Guelph.

In 2007 aboard Mike Fox, Wilson became the first woman to win North America's oldest and Canada's most important race, the Queen's Plate.

On September 16, 2012, Wilson joined jockey Francine Villeneuve to become only the second Canadian woman to achieve the 1,000 career victories plateau, as she rode "D'wildcat Gold" to victory in the first race at Woodbine. Three days later by taking the fifth and sixth races at Woodbine, Emma-Jayne moved ahead of Villeneuve as Canada's all-time winningest female jockey, a distinction that Villeneuve had held for over 10 years.

Wilson ranks first in career earnings among Canadian women, as she has earned well over $83,000,000 in purses for her mounts.

In 2015, Wilson won the Shergar Cup alongside teammates Sammy Jo Bell and Hayley Turner, marking the first victory for an all-female side in this event.

In 2018, she became just the second woman to win the Avelino Gomez Memorial Award, given annually to jockeys who have made significant contributions to Canadian thoroughbred horse racing.

Year-end charts

References

 CBS Sportsline
 Most Influential Women in Sport and Physical Activity
 35th Annual Eclipse Awards official website

External links
 Official website
 A fan first: Emma-Jayne Wilson Q&A

1981 births
Living people
Avelino Gomez Memorial Award winners
Eclipse Award winners
Sportspeople from Ontario
People from Brampton
Sovereign Award winners
University of Guelph alumni
Canadian female jockeys